The Thing on the Doorstep and Other Weird Stories is Penguin Classics' second omnibus edition of works by 20th-century American author H. P. Lovecraft. It was released in October 2001 and is still in print.

This edition is the second in Penguin Classics' series of paperback collections. Again, it collects a number of Lovecraft's most popular stories in their latest "definitive" editions as edited by S. T. Joshi. Many of the texts are the same as those from the earlier Arkham House hardcover editions, with the exception of At the Mountains of Madness, which has recently been released in a definitive edition by the Modern Library, with an introduction by China Miéville and also including Lovecraft's essay on the history and evolution of weird fiction, Supernatural Horror in Literature.

Its companion volumes from Penguin Classics are The Call of Cthulhu and Other Weird Stories (2001), and The Dreams in the Witch House and Other Weird Stories (2004).

Contents
The Thing on the Doorstep and Other Weird Stories contains the following tales:

 The Tomb
 Beyond the Wall of Sleep
 The White Ship
 The Temple
 The Quest of Iranon
 The Music of Erich Zann
 Imprisoned with the Pharaohs aka Under the Pyramids
 Pickman's Model
 The Case of Charles Dexter Ward
 The Dunwich Horror
 At the Mountains of Madness
 The Thing on the Doorstep

External links
Penguin Random House's page for the collection

All of the stories collected in this edition can also be found at Wikisource. Scholars should note that the texts transcribed on Wikisource may contain errors, or may represent "uncorrected" versions.

Short story collections by H. P. Lovecraft
Cthulhu Mythos anthologies
2001 short story collections